Antonio Cermeño (6 March 1969 – 25 February 2014) was a Venezuelan professional boxer who competed from 1990 to 2006. He is a world champion in two weight classes, having held the WBA super bantamweight title from 1995 to 1997 and the WBA featherweight title from 1998 to 1999.

Personal life and death
According to his wife, on 24 February 2014, the two of them and others were kidnapped in east Caracas. His wife escaped when the kidnappers released her after refueling the car, but Cermeño remained captive. He was found shot to death the next morning at kilometer 78 of the Gran Mariscal de Ayacucho highway.

Professional boxing record

References

External links 
 

1969 births
2014 deaths
2014 murders in Venezuela
Male murder victims
People from Miranda (state)
Featherweight boxers
People murdered in Venezuela
Deaths by firearm in Venezuela
Kidnapped Venezuelan people
Kidnappings in Venezuela
Venezuelan male boxers
Venezuelan murder victims